Joselito Altarejos is an accomplished Filipino filmmaker having won several prestigious awards in the Philippines as well as internationally. He is well known for his ground-breaking openly gay-themed film features like The Man in the Lighthouse (in Tagalog Ang Lalake sa Parola), Antonio's Secret (in Tagalog Ang Lihim ni Antonio), Kambyo, The Game of Juan's Life (in Tagalog Ang Laro ng Buhay ni Juan ), Pink Halo-Halo, Unfriend, The Commitment (in Tagalog Kasal). His 2017 film Tale of the Lost Boys was filmed in Taiwan. His films were celebrated at international LGBT film festivals. With his newly formed production, 2076 Kolektib, his ultimate goal is to create and produce multimedia contents that will arouse, educate, and inspire his audiences to become more vigilant and conscious of the social issues and challenges they face in the age of yet another strongman rule. In the true spirit of independent filmmaking, Altarejos’ decades of experience and continued quest to acquire more profound knowledge and creative enrichment is geared towards marshaling the sentient and jolting the uninformed – while still very much adhered to forming the Brockanian concept of the Great Filipino Audience. Altarejos has also worked for Filipino television doing series and anthologies including the long-running TV series Legacy on the GMA Network. In most of his television work, he is credited as Jose Altarejos and Jay Altajeros.

Career
The Game of Juan’s Life (2009) won Honorable Mention-Narrative Category at the 2010 Chicago Reeling in USA; while Antonio’s Secret (2008) was proclaimed Best Feature Film at Festival de la Luna 2010 in Valencia, Spain and Festival del Mar in Ibiza, Spain.

Pink Halo-Halo was a finalist in Cinemalaya 2010 Directors Showcase category and won Best Editing and Jury Prize Film for Children. It is about the effects of war on Filipino children and families. It is the first-ever feature film that used Bicolano language in the entire film. The film is in Tigaonon, the language of the people of Ticao Island in Masbate.

Unfriend premiered at the Panorama Section of the 2014 Berlinale (Berlin International Film Festival) and got international and local media attention for highlighting the "dangerous power of social media". Unfriend has been featured by major news organizations like Reuters, Huffington Post, ABS CBN and Philippine Daily Inquirer. It was released internationally by Fortissimo Films.

In 2014 his film The Commitment (In Tagalog Kasal) has been raved by critics. It won Best Feature Film, Best Music and Best Cinematography at the 10th Cinemalaya Independent Film Festival. Cinemalaya Philippine Independent Film Festival is the leading film festival in the Philippines. Kasal is a slice of life drama of a gay couple whose resolve to stay together is challenged as they attend a wedding ceremony. It is also an examination on how a gay couple navigates through the different institutions in Filipino society.

In 2016, Altarejos won the Best Screenplay award for his film T.P.O. (also known as Temporary Protection Order) which was about domestic violence and an entry to the Sinag Maynila Independent Film Festival headed by Brillante Mendoza. The film also won Best Sound ath the said festival.

In 2017, Altarejos released Tale of the Lost Boys, his first international feature, shot and produced in Taiwan. It is a story of friendship between a straight Filipino man and a gay Taiwanese aborigine who both have issues regarding their identities. It has been screened at several international festivals, including Rainbow Reel Tokyo, New York Lesbian, Gay, Bisexual, & Transgender Film Festival (NewFest), Taiwan International Queer Film Festival among others. It won Best Film at Romanian Gay Film Nights (Serile Filmului International Film Festival). In 2018, Altarejos made a comeback to Sinag Maynila International Film Festival in the Philippines with the film. The film won Best Film, Best Screenplay, Best Editing and Box Office Award.

Altarejos has also worked for television doing series and anthologies for Philippines top networks GMA and TV5. Using the names Jay Altarejos and Jay Altajeros (keeping the name Joselito Altarejos to his big screen features), he has directed a number of television series, notably the youth-oriented POSH and the long-running 98-episode TV series Legacy on the GMA Network.

The Revolution Knows No Gender, directed and written by Altarejos, was set to release at an independent film festival in Manila in February 2020. The film was disqualified for deviating from a previously approved script and removed from the festival. Altarejos alleged that the decision to not screen his film was politically motivated censorship.

Awards and nominations

Wins
2010 Festival de la Luna, the Valencia International Gay and Lesbian Film Festival: Won "Best Film" for Antonio's Secret. 
2010 Cinemalaya Independent Film Festival: Won "Best Edit" for Pink Halo-Halo.
2014 Cinemalaya Independent Film Festival: Winner for "Best Film - Director's Showcase"  (to director Joselito Altarejos for directing of Kasal) During the festival, it also won the "Cinematography" - Director's Showcase"  category (to Mycko David), "Production Design" - Director's Showcase"  (to Harley Alcasid) and "Original Music" - Director's Showcase"  (to Richard Gonzales) all for their work in Kasal)
2015 Gawad Tanglaw:  Jury Prize for Best Film (to Joselito Altarejos for  his film Kasal)
2016  Sinag Maynila Independent Film Festival:  Winner for "Best Screenplay" for  his film in T.P.O. (Temporary Protection Order". During the festival, it also won the "Sound Design" (to Andrew  Millalos).
2017 Serile Filmului International Film Festival: Winner for "Best Film" for Tale of the Lost Boys
2018 Sinag Maynila International Film Festival: Winner for "Best Film" for Tale of the Lost Boys. During the festival, it also won "Best Screenplay" (for May delos Santos) and "Best Editing" (for Diego Marx Dobles and Box Office Film).

Nominations
2008 Philippines FAP Awards: Nominated for "Best Production Design" (to Ma. Asuncion Torres and Anna Carmela Manda for their work in The Man in the Lighthouse) 
2008 Philippines Golden Screen Awards: Nominated for "Best Performance by an Actor in a Supporting Role in a Drama, Musical or Comedy" (for Justin De Leon in his role as Jerome in The Man in the Lighthouse)
2010 Cinemalaya Independent Film Festival: Nominated for "Best Film - Directors Showcase" (to director Joselito Altarejos for directing of Pink Halo-Halo)
2010 Cinemalaya Independent Film Festival: Winner of Special Jury Prize:  Films for Children for Pink Halo-Halo)
2014 Berlin International Film Festival: Nominated for "Best Film for "Unfriend" that premiered at the Panorama Section of the Berlinale)

Filmography

Director
Films and features
(all in Philippines, except Tale of the Lost Boys in Taiwan)
2007: The Man in the Lighthouse (in Tagalog Ang Lalake sa Parola)
2008: Antonio's Secret (in Tagalog title: Ang Lihim ni Antonio) 
2009: Little Boy Big Boy
2009: The Game of Juan's Life (in Tagalog Ang Laro ng Buhay ni Juan)
2010: Pink Halo-Halo 
2010: Boy Toys (in Tagalog Laruang Lalake)
2014: Unfriend 
2014: The Commitment (in Tagalog Kasal)
2016: T.P.O. (also known as Temporary Protection Order) 
2016: Death by Gokkun
2017: Tale of the Lost Boys
2019: Jino to Mari (Gino and Marie)
2020: Love and Pain in Between Refrains
2020: The Revolution Knows No Gender (Walang Kasarian Ang Digmang Bayan)

TV series
1998: Ganyan kita kamahal (TV series)
1998: Halik sa Apoy (TV series) 
2006: POSH (TV series) (credited as Jay Altarejos) 
2008: Dear Friend (TV series) 
2011: My Lover, My Wife (TV series) (as Jay Altajeros)
2011: Blusang Itim (TV series) 
2011: Kung aagawin mo ang langit (TV series) 
2012: Legacy (TV series) (98 episodes) (as Jay Altarejos, co-directed with Andoy Ranay)
2014: Obsession
2014-2015: Wattpad Presents series (all as Jay Altarejos):
2014: Wattpad Presents: Mr. Popular Meets Miss Nobody (5 episodes)
2014: Wattpad Presents: Poser (5 episodes) 
2014: Wattpad Presents: Mr. Popular Meets Miss Nobody: Still In Love (5 episodes)
2015: Wattpad Presents: BitterElla 
2015: Wattpad Presents: Heartbreaker 
2015: Wattpad Presents: Marry You

Producer
2007: Ang Lalake sa Parola (The Man in the Lighthouse) (line producer) 
2008: Ang Lihim ni Antonio (Antonio's Secret) (line producer) 
2008: Kambyo (line producer) 
2010: Pink Halo-Halo (producer) 
2010: Laruang Lalake (Boy Toys (co-producer) (credited as Joselito Altarejós) 
2013: Unfriend (producer)
2014: Kasal (The Commitment) (executive producer / producer)
2016: T.P.O. (producer)

Writer
2007: Ang Lalake sa Parola (The Man in the Lighthouse) (story)
2008: Ang Lihim ni Antonio (story) 
2008: Kambyo (story)
2009: Ang laro ng buhay ni Juan (screenplay) 
2010: Pink Halo-Halo (screenplay)
2014: Kasal (The Commitment) (story)
2016: T.P.O. (story)
2016: Death by Gokkun (story)

References

External links

Beyond the Box - by Jay Altarejos

Filipino film directors
Filipino film producers
Living people
Year of birth missing (living people)